The Kut Barrage is a barrage on the Tigris river, located in the modern town of Kut in Wasit Governorate, Iraq.

Technical details 
The barrage supports a road and includes a lock for boats passing up and down the Tigris. 

Its purpose is to maintain a sufficiently high water level in the Tigris to provide water for the Gharraf irrigation canal, which branches off the Tigris just upstream from the Kut Barrage. Before the construction of the Kut Barrage, the Gharraf canal only received water during periods of flood in the Tigris. The water level in the canal is maintained by the Gharraf Head Regulator, which was constructed at the same time as the Kut Barrage.

History 
The Kut Barrage was constructed between 1934 and 1939 by the British firm Balfour Beatty. For the barrage itself  of concrete was used. A major flood in the Tigris in 1936 caused the building site to be flooded entirely, and led to the temporary standstill of the construction works.

In 1952,  were irrigated from water provided by the Gharraf Canal. Of this newly reclaimed land,  was distributed to small farmers as part of a social land reform program.

In 2005, repairs and maintenance works were carried out at the Kut Barrage and the Gharraf Head Regulator for a total cost of US$3 million.

Gallery

References

Tigris River
Dams in Iraq
Wasit Governorate
Dams completed in 1939
Dams on the Tigris River
1939 establishments in Iraq
Barrage